Helen Beatty Noland was a state legislator in Colorado. A Republican, she represented La Plata County. She married James M. Noland, a district judge.

She, Kittie Brighton, and Annah G. Pettee sponsored a bill to allow physicians to provide information on birth control.

References

Year of birth missing
1962 deaths
Colorado Republicans
People from La Plata County, Colorado
Women state legislators in Colorado
20th-century American politicians
20th-century American women politicians